Korbang Jhimpe  is a village development committee in Salyan District in the Rapti Zone of western-central Nepal. At the time of the 2001 Nepal census it had a population of 636. According to the 2011 Nepal census Korbang Jhimpe had a population of 6,183.

References

External links
UN map of the municipalities of Salyan District

Populated places in Salyan District, Nepal